Alunda Church is a Lutheran church at  Alunda in Östhammar Municipality, Uppsala County, Sweden. The church is associated with  the Archdiocese of Uppsala of the Church of Sweden.

History and architecture
The oldest part of the church date from the 13th century, and the church was expanded to its present size during the 15th century. During this time the church also received internal brick vault. The church has been ravaged by fire in 1542, 1715 and 1859.

Among the furnishings, an altarpiece from 1862 was painted by the artist Johan Zacharias Blackstadius (1816-1898) with a framework carved by sculptor Fredrik Smedberg. The baptismal font is from the 15th century. The pulpit was carved in 1796 by Johan Westberg (1732-1811).  

The congregation is cooperating with a congregation in Marijampolė, Lithuania.

References

External links
Official site (in Swedish)

13th-century churches in Sweden
Churches in Uppsala County
Churches in the Diocese of Uppsala
Churches converted from the Roman Catholic Church to the Church of Sweden